Dudley House may refer to:
Dudley House, London, a Grade II* listed house in Mayfair, London
Dudley House (Ventura, California), listed on the NRHP in Ventura County, California
Jedidiah Dudley House, Old Saybrook, Connecticut, listed on the NRHP in Middlesex County, Connecticut
Dudley Farm, Newberry, Florida, listed on the NRHP in Alachua County, Florida
Dudley's Corner School House, Skowhegan, Maine, listed on the NRHP in Maine
Elson-Dudley House, Meridian, Mississippi, listed on the NRHP in Mississippi
Dudley House (Exeter, New Hampshire), listed on the NRHP in New Hampshire
Dudley, Guildfor, Sr., and Anne Dallas, House, Forest Hills, Tennessee, listed on the NRHP in Tennessee
Gwin Dudley Home Site, Wirtz, Virginia, listed on the NRHP in Virginia
Dudley House (Harvard College), the former name of the Dudley Community, at the time, a mixed undergraduate and graduate house at Harvard College